SWV or Sisters with Voices is an American female contemporary R&B group.

SWV may also refer to:
 ISO 639:swv or Shekhawati language, an Indo-Aryan language
 Severo-Evensk Airport (IATA: SWV), Evensk, Russia
 Something Weird Video, American home video company
 Squarewave voltammetry, a form of linear potential sweep voltammetry
 Symantec Workspace Virtualization, an application virtualization solution for Microsoft Windows
 The designation for compositions by German composer and organist Heinrich Schütz

See also
 SW5 (disambiguation)